(MMV) was a multinational corporation that produced animation, music, video games and television series. MMV is known for its involvement in the Story of Seasons series. They merged with AQ Interactive in 2011 and became Marvelous AQL; the "AQL" was dropped later on.

Local operations
Locally, MMV was involved in a number of forms of entertainment, including the production of anime and music by their two subsidiaries Artland and Delfi Sound respectively. Artland is an animation studio that produced a number of popular anime including the award-winning Mushishi and the hit shōnen Katekyō Hitman Reborn!, and Delfi Sound is a recording studio that was involved in the production of a number of albums, radio dramas, and soundtracks since its establishment in 2005. MMV also produced a number of live television series, movies, and musical theatre productions, like the highly popular Prince of Tennis musical, Tenimyu.

Merge with AQ Interactive

In 2011, AQ Interactive merged with Marvelous Entertainment (along with mobile gaming company Liveware). The combined company became Marvelous AQL Inc., and AQ was absorbed into the Marvelous business operations.

Subsidiaries

Artland, Inc.

It is an animation studio established on September 14, 1978. On April 3, 2006, it became a subsidiary of Marvelous Entertainment Inc.

Animation Studio Artland
Animation Studio Artland (株式会社アニメーションスタジオ・アートランド) is an animation studio established via dividing Artland, Inc. On 15 November 2010, Marvelous Entertainment Inc. announced the separating Artland, Inc.'s animation production into Animation Studio Artland, Inc. as a fully owned subsidiary of Marvelous Entertainment Inc., effective on December 1, 2010.

Marvelous Online
Marvelous Online (マーベラス・オンライン) is an online store for Marvelous Entertainment Inc. products.

On May 2, 2009, Marvelous Entertainment Inc. announced the establishment of Marvelous Online.

Former subsidiaries

Runtime, Inc.
Runtime, Inc. (有限会社ランタイム) was a software development, video game production, CG production company, established on July 18, 2001. On March 17, 2006, Marvelous Entertainment Inc. announced Runtime, Inc. would become a subsidiary of Marvelous Entertainment Inc., effective on April 3, 2006. On January 28, 2008, Marvelous Entertainment Inc. announced Runtime, Inc. would be merged into its parent company, Marvelous Entertainment Inc., effective on April 1, 2008.

Marvelous Music Publishing, Inc.
Marvelous Music Publishing, Inc. (株式会社マーベラス音楽出版) was a wholly owned subsidiary of Marvelous Entertainment Inc., established from its parent's former copyright and publishing businesses. On July 1, 2001, Marvelous Entertainment Inc. announced the establishment of Marvelous Music Publishing, Inc. On January 23, 2007, Marvelous Entertainment Inc. announced Marvelous Music Publishing, Inc. would be merged into its parent company, Marvelous Entertainment Inc., effective on April 1, 2007.

Marvelous Liveware Inc.
Marvelous Liveware Inc. (株式会社マーベラスライブウェア) was a mobile phone Internet contents development subsidiary of Marvelous Entertainment Inc. On April 27, 2004, Marvelous Entertainment Inc. announced the establishment of the subsidiary Marvelous Liveware Inc., effective on June 1, 2004. On March 31, 2005, Marvelous Entertainment Inc. announced the sales of Marvelous Liveware to Interspire, inc.

Marvelous Interactive Inc.
Marvelous Interactive Inc. (株式会社マーベラスインタラクティブ) was a developer and publisher of video games, established on August 3, 1970 as Pack-In-Video and later renamed Victor Interactive Software after Victor Entertainment merged with Pack-In-Video on October 1, 1996. On March 24, 2003, Marvelous Entertainment Inc. announced had acquired 55% stake of Victor Interactive Software, and would rename Victor Interactive Software to Marvelous Interactive Inc., effective on March 31, 2003. In the press release, Marvelous Entertainment Inc. listed the then upcoming Marvelous Interactive Inc. was established on October 1, 1996.

On September 10, 2003, Marvelous Entertainment Inc. announced Marvelous Interactive Inc. would become a wholly owned subsidiary of Marvelous Entertainment Inc. When Marvelous Entertainment Inc. completed its acquisition of Victor Interactive Software on March 31, 2003, it was renamed Marvelous Interactive. With this acquisition MMV obtained all the rights to the popular Story of Seasons series and other Victor Interactive Software series.

On March 20, 2007, Marvelous Entertainment Inc. announced Marvelous Interactive Inc. would be merged into its parent company, Marvelous Entertainment Inc., effective on June 30, 2007.

Mad
Mad (株式会社マッド) was an amusement facility operator.

On March 20, 2007, Marvelous Entertainment Inc. announced a restructuring plan that would transfer amusement business to Atlus, by moving it to Mad (株式会社マッド) as a wholly owned subsidiary of Marvelous Entertainment Inc., which would be established on June 1, 2007; the remaining businesses would be operated under Marvelous Entertainment Inc. The transfer also included sale of The Third Planet (株式会社ザ・サードプラネット) amusement operations, effective on July 1, 2007.

At Atlus, the company announced merging Mad into Atlus effective on September 1, 2007, with merger registered on September 3, 2007.

Delfi Sound Inc.
Delfi Sound Inc. (株式会社デルファイサウンド) It is a recording studio, album production, and music label company. The company was established on April 1, 2005 as Marvelous Studio Inc. (株式会社マーベラススタジオ)

On March 22, 2005, Marvelous Entertainment Inc. announced the establishment of the subsidiary Marvelous Studio Inc., effective on April 1, 2005.

On January 22, 2010, Marvelous Entertainment Inc. announced transferring 100% of its Delfi Sound Inc. shares to Amuse Capital Inc. (株式会社アミューズキャピタル), effective on January 29, 2010.

Rising Star Games Limited

It is a video game publisher and distributor within Europe and all other PAL territories.

On December 24, 2004, Marvelous Entertainment Inc. announced the establishment of a London-based joint venture company called Rising Star Games Limited with Bergsala AB. Marvelous Entertainment Inc. would own 51% shares of the company, while Bergsala AB own the remaining 49%. The company would begin operation in 2004–12.

MMV decided to gain a foothold on the European market first because most Japanese publishers have not really focused on it. About a year later, Rising Star Games and Atari teamed up to start releasing games for the Nintendo DS and PSP and has since experienced great success in Europe. As of March 31, 2008, Harvest Moon DS managed to sell over 300,000 copies and ship over 500,000 copies across the continent. Rising Star Games has also released over 30 games in Europe, including No More Heroes and a ported version of Harvest Moon: Magical Melody for the Wii.

On January 22, 2010, Marvelous Entertainment Inc. announced transferring all of its remaining 51% of Rising Star Games Limited stakes to Intergrow Inc. (株式会社インターグロー), effective on January 29, 2010.

Marvelous Entertainment USA, Inc. (MMV USA)
On May 9, 2008, MMV announced that it would be partnering up with Xseed Games to co-publish games in North America. On May 16, 2005, Marvelous Entertainment Inc. announced it had acquired the shares of an American company AQ Interactive and it would be renamed as Marvelous Entertainment USA as 100% subsidiary of Marvelous Entertainment effective in May 2005.

On May 9, 2008, Marvelous Entertainment Inc. and Xseed Games announced they had entered a co-publishing partnership. The North American video game sales would begin in November 2008. On May 31, 2011, Marvelous Entertainment Inc. announced transferring 100% of its Marvelous Entertainment USA, Inc. shares to Rising Star Games Limited, effective on June 30, 2011.

See also
List of Marvelous Entertainment games

References

External links
  Marvelous Entertainment Inc.
Delfi Sound Inc.
Marvelous Interactive Inc.

 
Video game development companies
Video game publishers
Video game companies established in 1997
Video game companies disestablished in 2011
Defunct video game companies of Japan
Companies formerly listed on the Tokyo Stock Exchange
1997 establishments in Japan